Justin Davis (born November 11, 1995) is a gridiron football running back for the Ottawa Redblacks of the Canadian Football League (CFL). He played college football at USC and signed with the Los Angeles Rams as an undrafted free agent in 2017.

Early life
Davis attended Lincoln High School in Stockton, California. While there he played high school football.

College career
Davis played college football for the USC Trojans. He was named third-team All-Pac-12 by analyist Phil Steele in 2015.

Collegiate statistics

Professional career

Los Angeles Rams
Davis signed with the Los Angeles Rams as an undrafted free agent on April 29, 2017. In Week 1, against the Indianapolis Colts in his NFL debut, Davis had his first career carry, a one-yard rush, in the 46–9 victory. As a rookie, he appeared in four games. In the 2018 season, he had two carries for 19 yards.

Davis was waived during final roster cuts on August 31, 2019.

Arizona Cardinals
On September 3, 2019, Davis was signed to the Arizona Cardinals' practice squad.  His practice squad contract with the team expired on January 6, 2020.

Ottawa Redblacks
Davis signed with the Ottawa Redblacks of the CFL on July 16, 2021, and was subsequently placed on the team's suspended list.

References

External links
Los Angeles Rams bio
USC Trojans bio

1995 births
Living people
African-American players of American football
American football running backs
Players of American football from Stockton, California
Players of Canadian football from Stockton, California
USC Trojans football players
Los Angeles Rams players
Arizona Cardinals players
Ottawa Redblacks players
21st-century African-American sportspeople